Odisha Bigyan Academy is a non-profit organisation in the Indian state of Odisha. It was established by professors and academics in science and technology to popularize scientific ideas and technological innovations among students and general public along with encouraging scientific research activities in the State under one umbrella. It encourages students to pursue science as a career and academics to excel in the field of science and engineering research.

History 
The academy was established on Odisha Day on 1 April 1981 and registered under the Registration of Societies Act. In 1985, the Government of Odisha recognized the Academy and its constitution via Resolution No. 3577/STE., dated 21/03/1985. It is under the administrative control of the Department of Science and Technology, Government of Odisha. The Academy has its office in the State capital, Bhubaneswar.

Publications 

The academy publishes two monthly publications: Bigyan Diganta in the Odia language and Science Horizon in English. The Academy publishes selected topics in a special issue of Bigyan Diganta magazine in Odia Braille to cater to the needs of visually impaired students. Scientists of different institutions are selected for the award from among the Odia scientists working in Odisha and outside Odisha.

List of presidents 

The honorary presidents since 1985 have been:
 Prof. Balabhadra Prasad, Ex-Principal, Ravenshaw College
 Prof. P. K. Jena, Ex-Director, Regional Research Laboratory
 Prof. Tribrikram Pati, Ex-Vice-Chancellor, Banaras Hindu University
 Prof. Siba Prasad Misra, Ex-Professor, Institute of Physics, Bhubaneswar
 Prof. Debakanta Mishra, Ex-Principal Ravenshaw College
 Prof. Basudev Kar, Ex-Principal, Shriram Chandra Bhanja Medical College
 Prof. Uma Charan Mohanty, Ex-Professor, Indian Institute of Technology Delhi
 Prof. Sanghamitra Mohanty, Ex-Vice Chancellor, North Orissa University (current)

Awards 
The academy has been giving awards and felicitations to eminent and senior scientists of Odisha State every year since 1987.

Biju Patnaik Award for Scientific Excellence

Samanta Chandra Sekhar Award 
The Samanta Chandra Sekhar Award, named after astronomer Samanta Chandra Sekhar, is awarded for outstanding research contribution in science and technology.

Odisha Young Scientist Award  
The Odisha Young Scientist Award is given for "outstanding research work" done by scientists under the age of 35 who were working inside the State of Orissa during the years preceding the year of award.

Pranakrushna Parija Popular Science Award 
The Pranakrushna Parija Popular Science Award, named after Prana Krushna Parija, is given to writers who have popularized critical scientific concepts and technological innovations through publication of books in the Odia language.

See also 
 Indian National Academy of Engineering
 Indian National Science Academy
 Indian Academy of Sciences
 National Academy of Sciences, India

References

External links 
 Official website 

1981 establishments in Orissa
Organisations based in Bhubaneswar
Science and technology in Bhubaneswar
Scientific societies based in India
Scientific organizations established in 1981
Indian science and technology awards